Paper Orchid is a 1949 British crime film directed by Roy Ward Baker, with a script written by Val Guest. It featured Hugh Williams, Hy Hazell and Garry Marsh, and was based on the 1948 novel of the same title by Arthur La Bern. It featured an early film appearance by Sid James, who later found success through the Carry On series.

It was shot at the Walton Studios just outside London. The film's sets were designed by the art director Bernard Robinson.

Plot 
Despite feeling that women are unsuited to journalism, Fleet Street newspaper editor Frank McSweeney hires Stella Mason as a reporter at the Daily National. Stella starts a hugely popular gossip column, gaining the nickname 'Paper Orchid'.

When her husband dies, Lady Croup becomes the new proprietor of the Daily National. She fires Frank and another journalist, 'Johnny' Johnson - both of whom join rival newspaper the World Record. After offending Lady Croup, Stella also loses her job.

When Stella's tenant is murdered, circumstantial evidence builds up against her. She takes the story to Frank, hoping that the World Record will give her a job in return for the scoop. When he tries to force her to publish it under her own by-line she takes it to the Daily National, where its crime reporter Freddy Evans is asked to investigate it.

It emerges that Freddy actually committed the murder. He files his final newspaper report: a confession. After declaring his love for Stella, he kills himself at Charing Cross Station.

In the epilogue, Frank decides to publish Freddy's last story - pausing momentarily when he hears of his tormented colleague's death.

Cast
 Hugh Williams as Frank McSweeney
 Hy Hazell as Stella Mason
 Sid James as Freddy Evans
 Garry Marsh as Johnson
 Andrew Cruickshank as Detective-Inspector Clement Pill
 Ivor Barnard as Eustace Crabb
 Walter Hudd as Briggs
 Ella Retford as Lady Croup
 Hughie Green as Harold Croup
 Vida Hope as Jonquil Jones
 Frederick Leister as Walter Wibberley
 Vernon Greeves  as John Deane
 Patricia Owens as Mary MacSweeney
 Rolf Lefebvre as 	Peter Pasterman
 Brian Oulton as Nightclub Manager 
 Andrew Sachs as Office Boy
 Ray Ellington as himself

References

Bibliography
 Mayer, Geoff. Roy Ward Baker. Manchester University Press, 2004.

External links

1949 films
Films directed by Roy Ward Baker
British crime films
1949 crime films
Films set in London
British black-and-white films
Films about journalists
Films based on British novels
Columbia Pictures films
Films shot at Nettlefold Studios
1940s British films